The antlered thorny katydid (Acanthoproctus cervinus) is a species of katydid that is found in South Africa and Namibia. It can be found in semi-arid and arid habitats, including the Kalahari Desert, the Namib Desert, and in the Karoo and Fynbos biomes.

References

Tettigoniidae
Insects described in 1842